The C.U.Shah College of Engineering and Technology, now known as the C.U.Shah University, is located in Surendranagar, Gujarat. This institute was established in September 1997. The C.U.Shah College of Engineering and Technology, also known as CCET, is approved by the AICTE, New Delhi and affiliated with C.U.Shah University. C.U.Shah University was established with the philanthropic help of Shri Chimanlal Ujamshibhai Shah.

Courses

Under graduate
 Automobile Engineering
 Electronics and Communication Engineering
 Mechanical Engineering
 Electrical Engineering
 Information Technology
 Computer Engineering
 Instrumentation & Control Engineering
 Civil Engineering

Post graduate
 M.Tech CAD/CAM
 M.Tech Electronics & Communication Engineering
 M.Tech Computer Engineering
 MBA

Management
C.U. Shah College of Engineering and Technology is managed by Wardhman Bharti Trust.

References

1997 establishments in Gujarat
Educational institutions established in 1997
Engineering colleges in Gujarat
Surendranagar